Eugenia calycina, also known as savannah cherry, field cherry, Jabuti cherry, Grao de galo, cerejinha, cereja de cerrado, pitanga-vermelha, red pitanga, pitanga cherry of cerrado, and ca-ajaboti, is a flowering shrub in the family Myrtaceae.

Distribution
Eugenia calycina is native to Brazil, including but not exclusive to the states of Goias, Sao Paulo, Minas Gerais, Mato Grosso do Sul, and Parana.

Description

The narrow, coriaceous leaves are evergreen and elliptic in shape. The flowers are pinkish-white with four round petals. They arise to new settlements on the side or edge among the stalks and measure  in length. It is edible and has a mild, sweet, berry-like flavor. It contains a single recalcitrant seed which germinates after 30–45 days of being planted. Seedling growth is rapid, with the plant often reaching  at 10 months of age. It fruits from November to January and flowers in spring. Fruiting begins when the plant is 2–3 years of age. The plant prefers positions in full sun or partial shade and tolerates semi-arid, rainy temperate, and subtropical to tropical dry and wet climates. They tolerate frost down to -4 C (25 F) and tolerate heat to 42 C (107 F). It tolerates sandy-loam soils and sand soils with quartz. The pH can range from 4.5 to 6.7, with some moisture.

Uses
The fruit is often gathered from the wild and eaten raw or made into jellies and sweets. It is used by native people to treat diabetes.

Chemistry
The fruit is rich in vitamin A. Several sesquiterpenes have been identified from the leaves of Eugenia calycina: bicyclogermacrene, spathulenol, beta-caryophyllene, aromadendrane‐4β,10α‐diol, and 1β‐11‐dihydroxy‐5‐eudesmene. The cytotoxic concentrations of the essential oil in the leaves for HeLa and Vero cells (266.8 ± 46.5 and 312.1 ± 42.5 μg mL−1) in 48 hours of exposure were higher than the LC50, which shows low cytotoxicity at the concentration exhibiting larvicidal activity. This indicates that the essential oil of Eugenia calycina shows high activity against the larvae of Aedes aegypti but has lower cytotoxicity against mammalian cells. Therefore, the leaves of Eugenia calycina are a promising source of natural larvicidal. The seeds, fruit pulp, and leaves contain a high phenolic content, with ellagic acid being the main compound with values of 8244.53 µg/g dw (leaves), 5054.43 µg/g dw (pulp), and 715.42 µg/g dw (seed). The total phenolic content in the leaves, pulp, and seed is 20371.96, 7139.70, and 2204.75 µg/g dw, with the main compounds being ellagic acid, myricitrin, and epicatechin gallate. The leaves, pulp, and seeds contain 153 different phytochemicals belonging to different chemical classes, including organic acids, phenolic acids, flavonoids, and others. Eugenia calycina has high potential as a plant food due to its high phenolic content and phytochemical profile. It also contains a number of oxygen-containing compounds such as fatty acids, steroids, and tannins. Compounds with high amounts of oxygen (such as glycosed flavonoids, tannins, and polyphenolic compounds) were revealed to show activity against Cryptococcus sp. D (minimum inhibitory concentration=15.62μg/mL). It was also revealed that compounds contained a decreased amount of oxygen (such as fatty acids and steroids) towards Cryptococcus gattii L48, Cryptococcus neoformans L3 (MIC=31.2μg/mL), and Cryptococcus sp. D (MIC=62.5μg/mL). Therefore, Eugenia calycina has potential for research of active substances that can be used for treatment of cryptococcosis.

See also
List of Eugenia species
List of culinary fruits
List of Brazilian fruits

References

Taxa named by Jacques Cambessedes
Plants described in 1832
Flora of Brazil
Edible fruits
calycina
Medicinal plants of South America